Elazığ District (also: Merkez, meaning "central") is a district of Elazığ Province of Turkey. Its seat is the city Elazığ. Its area is 2,243 km2, and its population is 443,363 (2021).

Composition
There are 5 municipalities in Elazığ District:
Akçakiraz
Elazığ
Mollakendi
Yazıkonak
Yurtbaşı

There are 134 villages in Elazığ District:

 Acıpayam
 Akçakale
 Alaca
 Alatarla
 Alpağut
 Altınkuşak
 Arındık
 Aşağıdemirtaş
 Avcılı
 Aydıncık
 Aydınlar
 Badempınarı
 Bağdere
 Bağlarca
 Balıbey
 Ballıca
 Balpınar
 Beşikköy
 Beşoluk
 Beydalı
 Beydoğmuş
 Bölüklü
 Bulutlu
 Cevizdere
 Cipköy
 Çağlar
 Çalıca
 Çatalharman
 Çöteli
 Dallıca
 Dambüyük
 Dedepınarı
 Değirmenönü
 Dereboğazı
 Doğankuş
 Durupınar
 Elmapınarı
 Erbildi
 Esenkent
 Fatmalı
 Gedikyolu
 Gökçe
 Gölardı
 Gölköy
 Gözebaşı
 Gözpınar
 Gülpınar
 Gümüşbağlar
 Günaçtı
 Günbağı
 Güneyçayırı
 Güzelyalı
 Hal
 Hankendi
 Harmantepe
 Hıdırbaba
 Hoşköy
 Işıkyolu
 İçme
 İkitepe
 Kalkantepe
 Kaplıkaya
 Karaali
 Karaçavuş
 Karasaz
 Karataş
 Kavakpınar
 Kavaktepe
 Kelmahmut
 Kepektaş
 Kıraçköy
 Koçharmanı
 Koçkale
 Konakalmaz
 Koparuşağı
 Korucu
 Koruköy
 Kozluk
 Körpe
 Kumla
 Kurtdere
 Kuşhane
 Kuşluyazı
 Kuyulu
 Küllük
 Meşeli
 Muratçık
 Nuralı
 Obuz
 Ortaçalı
 Oymaağaç
 Öksüzuşağı
 Örençay
 Pelteköy
 Pirinççi
 Poyraz
 Sakabaşı
 Salkaya
 Sancaklı
 Sarıbük
 Sarıçubuk
 Sarıgül
 Sarıkamış
 Sarılı
 Sarıyakup
 Sedeftepe
 Serince
 Sinanköy
 Sultanuşağı
 Sünköy
 Sütlüce
 Şabanlı
 Şahaplı
 Şehsuvar
 Şeyhhacı
 Tadım
 Temürköy
 Tepeköy
 Tohumlu
 Uzuntarla
 Üçağaç
 Ürünveren
 Yalındamlar
 Yalnız
 Yazıpınarı
 Yedigöze
 Yenikapı
 Yenikonak
 Yolçatı
 Yolüstü
 Yukarıçakmak
 Yukarıdemirtaş
 Yünlüce
 Yürekli

References

Districts of Elazığ Province